D. P. Khambete (Devanagari: द. पां. खांबेटे) was a Marathi writer from Maharashtra, India.

Khambete wrote short stories, some of them being of the humorous kind. The titles of his 21 books, including compilations of his stories and books which he wrote for children are available in:

https://web.archive.org/web/20110710195415/http://erasik.com/books/by/%E0%A4%96%E0%A4%BE%E0%A4%82%E0%A4%AC%E0%A5%87%E0%A4%9F%E0%A5%87%20%E0%A4%A6.%20%E0%A4%AA%E0%A4%BE%E0%A4%82./page1/

Possibly living people
Marathi-language writers